Broughton Rangers was as English professional rugby league club. Formed in 1877 as Broughton, the club changed its name to Broughton Rangers a year later. The club was based in Broughton until 1933, playing at Wheater's Field (until 1913) and The Cliff (1913–1933), before moving to Belle Vue Stadium in Gorton. The club was later renamed as Belle Vue Rangers after the Second World War, but folded in 1955. Broughton Rangers won one league championship in 1902, and were Challenge Cup winners on two occasions (1902 and 1911).

The record for most appearances for the club is held by George Ruddick, who played 422 times between 1899 and 1915. Andy Hogg is the record try scorer with 186, while Albert Gregory holds the record for most goals scored, having kicked 308 conversions. The record for most points is held by Bill Harris who scored a total of 835 during his career.

Honours

League
 Championship: 1901–02
 Lancashire Senior Competition: 1896–97, 1898–99
 South East Lancashire League: 1901–02

Cup
 Challenge Cup: 1901–02, 1910–11
 Lancashire Cup: 1906–07, 1920–21
 Salford Royal Hospital Cup: 1931–32, 1934–35

Club records

Matches
 Record win: 59–0 against Barton, 8 March 1913.
 Record defeat: 2–70 against Wigan, 28 September 1940.

Individual records

Appearances
 Most consecutive appearances: 137, Melbourne Tierney (23 September 1950 to 5 December 1953).

Most appearances

Tries
 Most tries in a season: 33, Bob Wilson in the 1901–02 season.
 Most tries in a match:
 6, Claude James (against Liverpool City, 13 October 1906).
 6, Walter Scott (against Barton, 8 March 1913).
 6, Clifford Mills (against Bramley, 7 April 1934).

Top tryscorers

Goals
 Most goals in a season: 86, Albert Gregory in the 1950–51 season.
 Most goals in a match:
 10, Joe Nelson (against Rothwell, 18 March 1899).
 10, Billy Harris (against Liverpool City, 13 October 1906).

Top goalscorers

References
 

Rugby league-related lists